The 2016 TCR International Series Oschersleben round was the sixth round of the 2016 TCR International Series season. It took place on 18–19 June at the Motorsport Arena Oschersleben.

Maťo Homola won the first race, starting from second position, driving a SEAT León TCR, and Pepe Oriola gained the second one, also driving a SEAT.

Ballast
Due to the results obtained in the previous round, Jean-Karl Vernay received +30 kg, James Nash +20 kg and Mikhail Grachev +10 kg.

Classification

Qualifying

Race 1

Race 2

Standings after the event

Drivers' Championship standings

Model of the Year standings

Teams' Championship standings

 Note: Only the top five positions are included for both sets of drivers' standings.

References

External links
TCR International Series official website

Oschersleben
TCR
TCR